Allan Teator Road Stone Arch Bridge is a historic stone arch bridge located at West Durham in Greene County, New York. It was constructed in 1892 and is a single span, dry laid limestone bridge with a round arch. It is seven feet wide. It spans a tributary of Catskill Creek.

It was a work of Durham highway commissioner Jeremiah Cunningham.

It was listed on the National Register of Historic Places in 2008.

See also

List of bridges and tunnels on the National Register of Historic Places in New York
National Register of Historic Places listings in Greene County, New York

References

Road bridges on the National Register of Historic Places in New York (state)
Bridges completed in 1892
Bridges in Greene County, New York
National Register of Historic Places in Greene County, New York
Stone arch bridges in the United States